Yuvaraju may refer to:
 Yuvaraju (1982 film), a Telugu-language drama film
 Yuvaraju (2000 film), a Telugu-language romantic drama film